Dirk Geeraerd (born 2 December 1963) is a Belgian former footballer and manager.

References
Site de La Dernière Heure, 26 octobre 2008
Waasland-Beveren limoge Dirk Geeraerd

External links
Dirk Geeraerd at Footballdatabase.eu

1963 births
Living people
People from Oudenaarde
Belgian footballers
Belgian football managers
F.C.V. Dender E.H. managers
K.S.V. Roeselare managers
K. Berchem Sport managers
S.C. Eendracht Aalst managers
K.M.S.K. Deinze managers
Association footballers not categorized by position
Footballers from East Flanders